Jiangtiao line of CRT is a suburban rapid transit line in Chongqing, China. The initial section of Jiangtiao line from Tiaodeng to Shengquansi opened on 6 August 2022.

This line had been known as the extension of Line 5 during its construction. Nevertheless, by the time it started operation, the color, train numbers and station codes of this line had all been separated from Line 5. However, in the future, through operation to/from Line 5 will be provided for this line.

Jiangtiao line is also the first rapid transit line in China that supports auto-switching between AC and DC sections without dropping pantographs down. Switch actions are performed at a dead section east of Zhongliangshan Tunnel.

Sections

Tiaodeng – Shengquansi 
The initial section from Tiaodeng to Shengquansi began construction in 2015. The section opened on 6 August 2022.

Shengquansi – Dingshan 
The remaining section from Shengquansi to Dingshan is currently under construction. Construction started on 28 December 2022. The section will be  in length with 2 stations.

Opening timeline

Stations 
Legend
 - In operation
 - Under planning

References

Chongqing Rail Transit lines